The 1966 Oregon State Beavers football team represented Oregon State University during the 1966 NCAA University Division football season. Four home games were played on campus in Corvallis at Parker Stadium and two at Multnomah Stadium  in Portland.

Under second-year head coach Dee Andros, the Beavers were 7–3 overall and 3–1 in the Athletic Association of Western Universities (AAWU, later Pacific-8 Conference, or Pac-8). Only one of the four conference teams from the state of California was on the schedule; champion USC shut out OSU in Portland.

Following a 1–3 start, OSU won its last six games, and were ranked nineteenth in the final UPI Coaches Poll.

The starting quarterbacks this season were senior Paul Brothers and sophomore Steve Preece. Workhorse senior fullback Pete Pifer became the school's all-time leading rusher, overtaking Sam Baker.

Schedule

Roster

Game summaries

Oregon

    
    
    
    
    
    

On a very muddy field at Parker Stadium, Beaver fullback Pete Pifer became the first in AAWU history to run for more than 1,000 yards in two consecutive seasons with 130 yards on 31 carries. Pifer and his backfield teammates, Paul Brothers and Bob Grim, combined for 284 total yards of the Beavers' offense.

References

External links
 Game program: Oregon State at Washington State – October 29, 1966
 WSU Libraries: Game video – Oregon State at Washington State – October 29, 1966

Oregon State
Oregon State Beavers football seasons
Oregon State Beavers football